Bruno Oliveira de Matos (born 5 June 1990) is a Brazilian professional footballer who plays for Saudi First Division League club Al-Jeel as an attacking midfielder or right winger.

Club career

Brasil
Born in Barra, in the Brazilian state of Bahia, Bruno played with XV de Piracicaba in the 2009–10 season from where he was brought in summer 2010 by Luis Felipe Scolari to Palmeiras and signed a 4-year contract with the club.  He debuted in the 2010 Campeonato Brasileiro Série A however as Scolari left Palmeiras, Bruno saw Scolari's successors making other choices so he struggled for a spot in the first team. In the second year he opted to accept a loan to Oeste during 2011.  On loan he play for a number of clubs during 2012.  In 2013 Bruno signed on loan with Juazeiro and his consistent performances with the club in the Campeonato Baiano earned him a move on loan in May to ASA playing in the Campeonato Brasileiro Série B.

He started 2014 by playing with Nacional-MG on loan from Palmeiras in the Campeonato Mineiro but by mid February he moved to Campeonato Baiano side Juazeirense on loan.

Serbia
In August 2014 he made his first move abroad, and on 28 August, he signed a 2-year contract with Serbian club FK Novi Pazar. His regular performances with Novi Pazar in the 2014–15 Serbian SuperLiga earned him a move at the end of the season to Serbian giants Red Star Belgrade. He made 5 appearances and scored once in the league for Red Star, but that ended up not being enough, and in order to gate more time on the pitch he was loaned back to his former club Novi Pazar during second half of the season. Finished the loan, he was released by Red Star in order to open a place for a foreign player.

Iran
After being released from Red Star Belgrade, Bruno ended up signing with Iranian side Sanat Naft Abadan.

Career statistics

Club

References

External links
Bruno Matos at Meus Resultados

1990 births
Brazilian footballers
Brazilian expatriate footballers
Association football midfielders
Esporte Clube XV de Novembro (Piracicaba) players
Sociedade Esportiva Palmeiras players
Oeste Futebol Clube players
Esporte Clube Noroeste players
Associação Atlética Ponte Preta players
Clube Atlético Sorocaba players
Juazeiro Social Clube players
Agremiação Sportiva Arapiraquense players
Nacional Futebol Clube players
Sociedade Desportiva Juazeirense players
Campeonato Brasileiro Série A players
Campeonato Brasileiro Série B players
FK Novi Pazar players
Red Star Belgrade footballers
Serbian SuperLiga players
Persian Gulf Pro League players
Expatriate footballers in Serbia
Brazilian expatriate sportspeople in Serbia
Sanat Naft Abadan F.C. players
Expatriate footballers in Iran
Brazilian expatriate sportspeople in Iran
Bahraini Premier League players 
Manama Club players
Expatriate footballers in Bahrain
Brazilian expatriate sportspeople in Bahrain
Malaysia Super League players
PKNS F.C. players
Expatriate footballers in Malaysia
Brazilian expatriate sportspeople in Malaysia
Liga 1 (Indonesia) players
Persija Jakarta players
Bhayangkara F.C. players
Madura United F.C. players
PS Barito Putera players
Expatriate footballers in Indonesia
Brazilian expatriate sportspeople in Indonesia
V.League 1 players
Viettel FC players
Expatriate footballers in Vietnam
Brazilian expatriate sportspeople in Vietnam
Expatriate footballers in Saudi Arabia
Brazilian expatriate sportspeople in Saudi Arabia
Al Jeel Club players
Saudi Second Division players
Living people